Karla Cubias  (born May 23, 1983 in Santa Ana) is a Salvadoran singer and Semi-Final 2 of the fourth season of the television program Latin American Idol. As a child she felt enchanted by the music and awakens her love for singing. At age 12, shes part of a church choir, so waking up even more interest in this beautiful art. Raid on her musical career in 2006, being chosen as a contestant in the Youth Festival III song is among the ten finalists and getting very good reviews all over her performance in this competition. The year 2008 marked her life as a dreamer holding auditions at the prestigious PROGRM "Singing for a Dream El Salvador", having as a companion to a large music bernácula of El Salvador, Victor Emmanuelle. Victor made a special chemistry on stage and taking the admiration and respect of all the Salvadoran people and getting between 12 pairs, the second place.

The year 2009 presents a new challenge to Karla, as part of a pop band called "Connect" made up of 5 very talented and young people on a tour of eight concerts nationwide. That same year, participated in the auditions for "Latin American Idol" was selected to represent El Salvador at this great level of competition throughout Latin America. Among thousands of young people from different countries and with the same dream, Karla is chosen to be part of a very select group of 24 boys. Karla had the privilege of opening the concert of great Guatemalan singer Ricardo Arjona at the Stadium "Jorge Magico Gonzalez" of San Salvador.

So also opened the concert by the group "Camila" currently is working on promoting her music and some issues of their first album including "I can not believe in love," "Because I love you" and the most recent "Let's Dance Tonight" which was recorded the first music video a very promising issue. dream is to bring Karla Cubías their music beyond the borders Salvadoran and be recognized as a great artist, without neglecting support works which social work continuously. Karla has contact with foundations to help people in need, lives and works under the premise that one needs to transmit the blessings in life by supporting others to achieve a multiplier effect and in society.

External links
Latin American's Idol Official website

1983 births
Living people
Salvadoran women singers
People from Santa Ana, El Salvador
21st-century women singers